Futurity is an unincorporated community in Chaffee County, Colorado, in the United States.

References

Unincorporated communities in Chaffee County, Colorado
Unincorporated communities in Colorado